Reigi is a village in Hiiumaa Parish, Hiiu County in northwestern Estonia.

History
In 1984 Estonian writer Herman Sergo published the novel Näkimadalad, whose title is based on the name of the Nekmangrund shoal. In his three-volume work Sergo portrays the tragic fate of the Estonian Swedes living in Reigi village, located to the south of the shoal on Hiiumaa Island, which were deported in the 18th century to Southern Ukraine following a Russian Imperial decree.

See also
Reigilaid
Hiiu Shoal

References

Villages in Hiiu County

sv:Dagö#Byar